János Kelen (11 February 1911 – 13 October 1991) was a Hungarian long-distance runner. He competed in the men's 5000 metres at the 1936 Summer Olympics.

References

1911 births
1991 deaths
Athletes (track and field) at the 1936 Summer Olympics
Hungarian male long-distance runners
Olympic athletes of Hungary
Place of birth missing